Jetmir Sefa (born 30 January 1987) is an Albanian professional footballer who plays as a midfielder.

Club career

Tirana

2005–06 season
Sefa is a product of the KF Tirana academy and joined the club in 2000 as a 13-year-old, where he rose through the ranks before eventually reaching the first team in 2005. He was promoted to the first team ahead of the 2005–06 campaign by Leonardo Menichini, who was the head coach at the club at the time, and he joined a competitive midfield which included Ervin Bulku, Sajmir Patushi, Devi Muka, Klodian Duro and Cristiano Muzzachi.

He made his league debut on 7 September 2005 in an away game against Shkumbini Peqin as an 18-year-old, where he started the game in a midfield made up of Devi Muka, Ervin Bulku and Engert Bakalli. His debut ended in 1–1 draw, in a game which saw Sefa being one of 4 players to be cautioned and his teammate Arjan Pisha receiving a straight red card. He made 14 league appearances throughout the 2005–06 Albanian Superliga, starting 8 of them and competing the full 90 minutes on 4 occasions. KF Tirana finished runners-up in the league to KF Elbasani, who won their first Albanian Superliga title since 1984. He was also part of the 2005–06 Albanian Cup winning squad, which was his first ever professional title.

2006–07 season
He began the following season in a UEFA Cup qualifier against Croatian NK Varteks, where he travelled with the squad to Varaždin only to make a cameo appearance on his European debut, as he came on as a 90th-minute substitute for Vioresin Sinani in the 1–1 draw. He did not feature in the return leg, which saw his side progress to the next round following a 2–0 victory. He did not feature in the first leg of KF Tirana's next UEFA Cup fixture against Kayserispor, but he did play in the second leg as KF Tirana were knocked out of the competition by the Turkish side. He featured in 21 league games during the 2006–07 Albanian Superliga campaign as KF Tirana won the league after finishing runners-up the season before.

2007–08 season
Following the departure of Ervin Bulku to FC Kryvbas Kryvyi Rih in the summer of 2007, Sefa was given the number 8 shirt, which was seen as a great privilege by the club to give the young midfielder the number of a departing legend. He scored his first league goal for the club on 1 September 2007 in a home match against Shkumbini Peqin, in a season where he featured in 13 league games and scored 3 goals in the process as his side finished in a disappointing 6th place, and Albanian cup runners-up.

Laçi
On 6 June 2014, Sefa completed a transfer to Laçi as a free agent by penning a contract until the end of 2014–15 season. However, he left the team on 5 January of the following by terminating his contract with the club.

Return to KF Tirana
He rejoined Tirana in January 2015 after agreeing terms with his previous club Laçi in order to complete the transfer, for a reported nominal fee of 300,000 Albanian lek (around €2,150). He made his return debut for the club on 24 January against Apolonia Fier, coming on as a 62nd-minute substitute for Mario Morina in the 2–0 win.

Vllaznia Shkodër
On 1 September 2015, in the last day of summer transferts window, Sefa left Tirana and signed with Vllaznia Shkodër for an undisclosed fee, taking the vacant number 24 for the 2015–16 season.

On 3 October 2015, Sefa scored his first goal for the club, a last-minute equaliser from a free kick against Kukësi, giving the team the first point of the season after five consecutive loses.

Kamza
On 2 August 2016, Sefa agreed personal terms and joined Albanian First Division side Kamza as a free agent, signing a one-year contract. He was presented on the same day along with Valdan Nimani and Elton Basriu, and was handed squad number 8.

Liria Prizren
On 5 July 2017, Sefa signed a contract with Liria Prizren of Football Superleague of Kosovo, rejoining his former teammate Bledi Shkëmbi now as coach.

International career

Senior team
He received his first call up for the Albania national team by Josip Kuže  for a friendly against Cyprus on 12 August 2009, which ended in a record breaking 6–1 win for Albania as Sefa had a debut to remember.

Style of play
Sefa mainly operates as a central midfielder but he can also play in a more advances role, as well as having played on both the left and right sides of the midfield.

Career statistics

Honours

Club
Tirana
Albanian Superliga: 2006–07, 2008–09
Albanian Cup: 2005–06
Albanian Supercup: 2007, 2009

Skënderbeu Korçë
Albanian Superliga: 2010–11

References

External links

Jetmir Sefa at FSHF
Footballdatabase profile

1987 births
Living people
Association football midfielders
Footballers from Tirana
Albanian footballers
Albania youth international footballers
Albania under-21 international footballers
Albania international footballers
KF Tirana players
KF Skënderbeu Korçë players
KF Laçi players
KS Kastrioti players
KF Bylis Ballsh players
KF Vllaznia Shkodër players
FC Kamza players
KF Liria players
FK Dinamo Tirana players
KF Besa Kavajë players
Kategoria Superiore players
Kategoria e Parë players
Football Superleague of Kosovo players
Albanian expatriate footballers
Expatriate footballers in Kosovo
Albanian expatriate sportspeople in Kosovo